His Majesty's Inspectorate of Constabulary in Scotland (HMICS) is a public body of the Scottish Government and reports to the Scottish Parliament. It has statutory responsibility for the inspection of the effectiveness and efficiency of the police service in Scotland.

HMICS is part of a tripartite distribution of powers for accountability for the Scottish police service. The Scottish Government has powers to make regulations for the governance and administration of the police force and the promotion of efficiency. The Scottish Police Authority is responsible for setting the budget and ensuring that best value is attained for the public purse. The chief constable is responsible for operational policing.

The head of the service is HM Chief Inspector of Constabulary, held by Craig Naylor since March 2022.

The HMICS is based at St Andrew's House in Edinburgh and had £1.2m of funding allocated by the Scottish Government in 2013–14.

History
HMICS was established by the Police (Scotland) Act 1857.

Until 1 April 2013, HMICS was responsible for inspections of the eight Scottish territorial police forces, the Scottish Crime and Drug Enforcement Agency, the Scottish Criminal Record Office, the Scottish Police College and the Scottish Police Information Strategy.

Until 1 April 2007, HMICS was also responsible for dealing with complaints against the police; since then non-criminal complaints have been dealt with by the Police Complaints Commissioner, following the passing of the Police, Public Order and Criminal Justice (Scotland) Act 2006. HMIC has no authority to deal with complaints against chief police officers.

List of chief inspectors
John Kinloch, 18571872
Charles Carnegie, 18721884 
David Monro, 18841904  
Arthur George Ferguson, 19041927
William David Allan, 19271930
Robert Maxwell Dudgeon, 19301945
Sidney Anderson Kinnear, 19461957  
Thomas Renfrew, 19581966 
Andrew Meldrum, 19661969
David Gray, 19701979
Edward Frizzell, 19791983
Alexander Morrison, 19831990
Colin Sampson, 19911993
John MacInnes Boyd, 19931996
William George MacKenzie Sutherland, 19961998
William Taylor, 19992001
Hugh Roy Graham Cameron, 20022004
Andrew Gibson Brown, 20042007
Paddy Tomkins, 20072009 
Andrew Laing, 20102013
George Graham, 20132014
Derek Penman, 20142018
Gill Imery, 2018March 2022
Craig Naylor, 2022-present
″

See also
His Majesty's Inspectorate of Prisons for Scotland
Public bodies of the Scottish Government

References

External links
 
 

1857 establishments in Scotland
1857 in British law
Government agencies established in 1857
Law enforcement in Scotland
Ombudsmen in Scotland
Organisations based in Edinburgh
Police misconduct in the United Kingdom
Police oversight organizations
Public bodies of the Scottish Government